
Year 38 BC was either a common year starting on Sunday or Monday or a leap year starting on Saturday, Sunday or Monday (link will display the full calendar) of the Julian calendar (the sources differ, see leap year error for further information) and a common year starting on Sunday of the Proleptic Julian calendar. At the time, it was known as the Year of the Consulship of Pulcher and Flaccus (or, less frequently, year 716 Ab urbe condita). The denomination 38 BC for this year has been used since the early medieval period, when the Anno Domini calendar era became the prevalent method in Europe for naming years. It was also the first year (year 1) of the Spanish era calendar in use in Hispania until the 15th century.

Events 
 By place 

 Roman Republic 
 January 1 – Beginning of the Hispanic era, by orders of Octavian Caesar.
 January 17 – Octavian marries Livia while she is still pregnant from a recently broken marriage. Octavian gains permission from the College of Pontiffs to wed her while she is still pregnant from another husband. Three months after the wedding she gives birth to a second son, Nero Claudius Drusus, while he and his elder brother, the four-year-old Tiberius, are living in Octavian's household.
 Octavian appoints Marcus Vipsanius Agrippa governor of Transalpine Gaul, where he puts down an uprising of the Aquitanians. He also fights successfully against the Germanic tribes, and becomes the next Roman general to cross the Rhine after Julius Caesar.
 Parthian invasion into Roman Syria; Publius Ventidius Bassus defeats Pacorus, at the crossing of the Euphrates in the Battle of Cyrrhestica. Ventidius lays siege to Antiochus I Theos of Commagene in Samosata until relieved by Antony.

Births 
 January 14 –  Nero Claudius Drusus, Roman politician and military commander, future stepson of Augustus Caesar (d. 9 BC)
 Lucius Volusius Saturninus, Roman suffect consul (or 37 BC)

Deaths 
 Antiochus I Theos, king of Commagene (b. c. 86 BC)
 Pacorus I, crown prince of Parthia (b. c. 63 BC)

References